Fluphenazine, sold under the brand name Prolixin among others, is a high-potency typical antipsychotic medication. It is used in the treatment of chronic psychoses such as schizophrenia, and appears to be about equal in effectiveness to low-potency antipsychotics like chlorpromazine. It is given by mouth, injection into a muscle, or just under the skin. There is also a long acting injectable version that may last for up to four weeks. Fluphenazine decanoate, the depot injection form of fluphenazine, should not be used by people with severe depression.

Common side effects include movement problems, sleepiness, depression and increased weight. Serious side effects may include neuroleptic malignant syndrome, low white blood cell levels, and the potentially permanent movement disorder tardive dyskinesia. In older people with psychosis as a result of dementia it may increase the risk of dying. It may also increase prolactin levels which may result in milk production, enlarged breasts in males, impotence, and the absence of menstrual periods. It is unclear if it is safe for use in pregnancy.

Fluphenazine is a typical antipsychotic of the phenothiazine class. Its mechanism of action is not entirely clear but believed to be related to its ability to block dopamine receptors. In up to 40% of those on long term phenothiazines, liver function tests become mildly abnormal.

Fluphenazine came into use in 1959. The injectable form is on the World Health Organization's List of Essential Medicines. It is available as a generic medication. It was discontinued in Australia in 2017.

Medical use
A 2018 Cochrane review found that fluphenazine was an imperfect treatment and other inexpensive drugs less associated with side effects may be an equally effective choice for people with schizophrenia.

Side effects

Discontinuation
The British National Formulary recommends a gradual withdrawal when discontinuing antipsychotics to avoid acute withdrawal syndrome or rapid relapse. Symptoms of withdrawal commonly include nausea, vomiting, and loss of appetite. Other symptoms may include restlessness, increased sweating, and trouble sleeping. Less commonly there may be a feeling of the world spinning, numbness, or muscle pains. Symptoms generally resolve after a short period of time.

There is tentative evidence that discontinuation of antipsychotics can result in psychosis. It may also result in reoccurrence of the condition that is being treated. Rarely tardive dyskinesia can occur when the medication is stopped.

Pharmacology

Pharmacodynamics

Fluphenazine acts primarily by blocking post-synaptic D2 receptors in the basal ganglia, cortical and limbic system. It also blocks alpha-1 adrenergic receptors, muscarinic-1 receptors, and histamine-1 receptors.

Pharmacokinetics

History
Fluphenazine came into use in 1959.

Availability
The injectable form is on the World Health Organization's List of Essential Medicines. It is available as a generic medication.  It was discontinued in Australia in 2017.

Veterinary 
In horses, it is sometimes given by injection as an anxiety-relieving medication, though there are many negative common side effects and it is forbidden by many equestrian competition organizations.

References

External links
 

Alpha-1 blockers
Alpha-2 blockers
Antiemetics
Dopamine antagonists
Phenothiazines
Piperazines
Primary alcohols
Sigma receptor ligands
Trifluoromethyl compounds
Typical antipsychotics
Withdrawn drugs
World Health Organization essential medicines
Wikipedia medicine articles ready to translate